Bartym (Bartım) is a rural locality (a village) in Ozerkinsky Selsoviet, Karaidelsky District, Bashkortostan, Russia. The population was 158 as of 2010. There are 6 streets.

Geography 
Bartym is located 44 km east of Karaidel (the district's administrative centre) by road. Biyaz is the nearest rural locality.

References 

Rural localities in Karaidelsky District